The Taman languages form a putative branch of the Eastern Sudanic language family spoken in Chad and Sudan, though Glottolog notes that "no conclusive, methodologically sound basis for assigning Tama to Eastern Sudanic" has been presented.

The languages are:

Tama
Mararit (Ibiri, Abu Charib)
(other)
Miisiirii
Tama–Sungor
Sungor (Assangori, incl. Erenga)
Tama (Damut)

Claude Rilly (2010) includes reconstructions for Proto-Taman.

See also
List of Northern Eastern Sudanic reconstructions (Wiktionary)

References

 
Language families
Northern Eastern Sudanic languages